"The Family: A Proclamation to the World" is a 1995 statement issued by the Church of Jesus Christ of Latter-day Saints (LDS Church) which defined the official position of the church on family, marriage, gender roles, and human sexuality. It was first announced by church president Gordon B. Hinckley.

History
Hinckley first read the Proclamation on September 23, 1995, at the church's General Relief Society Meeting, stating that the purpose was to "warn and forewarn" the world to the danger of deviating from its standards. In 1997, the LDS Church included the text of the Proclamation in an amicus brief to petition the Hawaii Supreme Court to reject same-sex marriage. The LDS Church has published copies of the Proclamation in many languages, distributing them worldwide, and some Latter-day Saints have framed the Proclamation for display in their church buildings and homes.

The Proclamation has been discussed and referenced in the church's general conferences as well as in many other types of church meetings throughout the world. For instance, the Proclamation and the associated issues addressed were discussed during the church's 2008 Worldwide Leadership Training Meeting.

The Proclamation has also been influential among leaders of other religious traditions. For example, in 2014 the Vatican's Humanum: An International Interreligious Colloquium on the Complementarity of Man and Woman featured several world leaders including Pope Francis and Muslim theologian Dr. Rasoul Rasoulipour quoting from or citing its basic teachings.

Contents 

Although the Proclamation presents no new doctrines or policies, it provides an official statement of the church on gender and sexual relations.

Doctrinal assertions
 Marriage between a man and a woman is ordained of God.
 The family is ordained of God and central to God's plan.
 All human beings are created in the image of God.
 As a beloved spirit son or daughter of Heavenly Parents, each person has a divine nature and destiny.
 Gender is an essential characteristic of human identity before, during, and after life on Earth.
 "In the premortal realm, spirit sons and daughters knew and worshiped God as their Eternal Father and accepted His plan."
 "Sacred ordinances and covenants available in holy temples of The Church of Jesus Christ of Latter-day Saints make it possible for individuals to return to the presence of God and for families to be united eternally."
 God will hold parents accountable for the way in which they fulfill responsibilities to their families.
 "Children are entitled to birth within the bonds of matrimony, and to be reared by a father and a mother who honor marital vows with complete fidelity."

Items of counsel
 God's commandment to Adam and Eve in the Garden of Eden to multiply and replenish the earth remains in force.
 Sexual relations are sacred and properly take place only between a man and a woman, lawfully wedded as husband and wife. 
 Procreation is divinely appointed, and therefore life is sacred and an important part of God's plan.
 Parents have "a solemn responsibility to love and care for each other and for their children."
 Parents' responsibilities toward their children include rearing them "in love and righteousness," providing "for their physical and spiritual needs," and teaching "them to love and serve one another, observe the commandments of God, and be law-abiding citizens."
 Happiness and success come through following the teachings of Jesus and through "faith, prayer, repentance, forgiveness, respect, love, compassion, work, and wholesome recreational activities."
 "By divine design fathers are to preside over their families in love and righteousness and are responsible to provide the necessities of life and protection for their families."
 "Mothers are primarily responsible for the nurture of their children."
 "Fathers and mothers are obligated to help one another as equal partners."
 Citizens and officers of government should "promote those measures designed to maintain and strengthen the family as the fundamental unit of society."

Warnings
 Those who commit adultery or "abuse spouse or offspring, or who fail to fulfill family responsibilities will one day stand accountable before God."
 Disintegration of the family will bring "calamities foretold by ancient and modern prophets."

Criticism

The LGBT advocacy group Human Rights Campaign has cited the Proclamation as an indication that although telling families not to reject children due to their sexual orientation and telling members to treat them with love and compassion, the church restricts those who believe themselves to be gay, lesbian, bisexual, and transgender from fully integrating into the LDS Church if they act on their same-sex attraction. Those who do act on their feelings may be disciplined in various ways including excommunication. Because discipline is administered locally actual practice differs geographically.
The church also issued this statement after the Human Rights Campaign's criticism:

Status
The LDS Church has characterized the Proclamation as a reaffirmation of standards "repeatedly stated throughout its history." Apostle Boyd K. Packer also stated in General Conference that it "qualifies according to the definition as a revelation and it would do well that members of the
Church read and follow it." It is particularly important because, although not canonized, the Proclamation is only the fifth such statement in the history of the church. The Proclamation was especially authoritative because it was issued in the name of the three members of the First Presidency and the members of the Quorum of the Twelve Apostles, each of the fifteen signatories being considered by members of the LDS Church as "prophet, seer, and revelators."  The principles established by the Proclamation were cited by Latter-day Saints during the campaign by the LDS Church and its members in support of California Proposition 8 (2008).

See also

 Proclamations of the First Presidency and the Quorum of the Twelve Apostles
 California Proposition 22 (2000)
 Homosexuality and The Church of Jesus Christ of Latter-day Saints
 List of Mormon family organizations
 The Living Christ: The Testimony of the Apostles
 The Restoration of the Fulness of the Gospel of Jesus Christ: A Bicentennial Proclamation to the World

Notes

External links
 "The Family: A Proclamation to the World", churchofjesuschrist.org
 "'The Family: A Proclamation to the World' Reaches 10-year Milestone", churchofjesuschrist.org
 “Gordon B. Hinckley reading The Family: A Proclamation to the World”

1995 documents
1995 in Christianity
Latter Day Saint statements of faith
Sexuality and Mormonism
Proclamations
Relief Society
The Church of Jesus Christ of Latter-day Saints texts
Works about families
Works originally published in Ensign (LDS magazine)
Young people and the Church of Jesus Christ of Latter-day Saints
Mormonism and politics
Marriage in Mormonism
Works by apostles (LDS Church)
Mormonism-related controversies